Aurel Dermek, born 25 July 1925, died 15 April 1989 in Bratislava, was a Slovak mycologist.

Publications
Naše huby (1967)
Hríbovité huby (1974)
Poznávajme huby (1974)
Atlas našich húb (1977)
Malý atlas húb (1980)

References

1925 births
1989 deaths
Czechoslovak botanists
Slovak mycologists